Faiz-ul-Aqtab Siddiqi (born 1967) is a Muslim scholar, principal of the Hijaz College, National Convenor of the Muslim Action Committee (MAC), Secretary General of the International Muslims Organisation, Grand Blessed Guide of the Naqshbandi Hijazi Sufi Order and a barrister at law.

Family of Religious Scholars 
Shaykh Faiz-ul-Aqtab Siddiqi is the eldest son of the late Abdul Wahab Siddiqi and the grandson of Maulana Muhammad Umar Icharvi. He studied under his father and many other Shayukh of the time. Later he studied at Al-Azhar University in Egypt

Principle of Hijaz College 
He is the principal and founding trustee of Hijaz College in Nuneaton, England, where he resides on campus.

Champion of Muslim Unity 
Shaykh Siddiqi is a signatory to Charter 3:103 based on the verse of the Qur'an which urges Muslims to remain united despite sectarian differences.

Convenor of the Muslim Action Committee and Muslim Action Forum 
Siddiqi convened the Muslim Action Committee, an umbrella organisation of Sunni and Shia Islamic scholars and Islamic political groups such as the Islamic Human Rights Commission and Hizb ut-Tahrir to organise a demonstration against the repeated publications of the Danish cartoons of the Islamic prophet, Muhammad. The demonstration was the largest in Europe and the largest within the UK since the Salman Rushdie incident. The organisation works to combat attacks on Islamic religious symbols.

Founder of Hijaz Community 
Siddiqi is the founder of the Hijaz Community which operates in various parts in the country to build social cohesion and spirituality in society.

Profession as Barrister 
He is a barrister under English and Welsh law, and as such is a member of the Lincoln's Inn. He practises commercial and conflict law, limiting this to three days per month as his main focus is on social engineering programmes to rejuvenate Muslim communities and enhance their spiritual prosperity.

Controversy

Over Sharia courts in the UK 
Siddiqi was among the guests on the Law in Action programme aired on 28 November 2006 which discussed the issue of Sharia courts in the UK, which was covered by many newspapers and other media. Siddiqi made the following observation about the issues:

"Because we follow the same process as any case of arbitration, our decisions are binding in English law. Unless our decisions are unreasonable, they are recognised by the High Court."

Siddiqi was also involved in a debate in London in February 2008 entitled KINGDOM OF GOD: the Archbishop, the Sharia and the Law of the Land in response to a speech by Archbishop Rowan Williams, in which Siddiqi defended and advocated the use of Islamic Family Law in the UK and showed hope that in the future a more educated and spiritual Muslim community in Britain would be able to live under all aspects of Sharia Law.

Siddiqi launched the Muslim Arbitration Tribunal to deal with the issue of forced marriages within the Muslim community.

Siddiqi delivered a lecture within the walls of Temple Church entitled "Family Law, Minorities and legal Pluralism: Should English Law give more Recognition to Islamic Law?" in November 2008 which sparked media controversy over its endorsement of polygamy.

Haslam Foundation 
Worked with the Haslam Foundation in various projects in Pakistan, from new water wells to establishing basic schooling for children in the deprived areas

Mecca via Wall Street 
Siddiqi has recently launched Hijaz Community with a series of events entitled Mecca via Wall St. The events have been on the concept of civic, social and corporate responsibility. With partners in the corporate sector, mainly through a new insurance company, called 'Muslim Insurance' these events have been organised in order to raise money for charity and promote the work of Hijaz Community. Muslim Insurance itself is a charitable company that donates 50% of its profits to charity, and is supported by over 700 Islamic scholars.

References 

 The Daily Telegraph

External links
Hijaz College
Mecca via Wall Street
Hijaz Community
International Muslims Organisation
Naqshbandi Hijazi Sufi Order
Blessed Summit
A Speech in Pennsylvania on Islam and Democracy
Launch of Muslim Arbitration Tribunal
Muslim Arbitration Tribunal Website

Naqshbandi order
English Muslims
British barristers
Pakistani Sufis
Pakistani Sufi religious leaders
Sunni Sufis
British Sufis
1967 births
Living people
English people of Pakistani descent
Pakistani emigrants to the United Kingdom
Naturalised citizens of the United Kingdom
Al-Azhar University alumni